Charged is a collaborative album by Eraldo Bernocchi, Toshinori Kondo and Bill Laswell, released on June 28, 1999 by Apollo Records.

Track listing

Personnel 
Adapted from the Charged liner notes.
Musicians
Eraldo Bernocchi – guitar, drum programming, electronics, producer, recording, mixing
Toshinori Kondo – trumpet, recording, mixing, producer
Bill Laswell – bass guitar (1-4, 8)
Technical personnel
Michael Fossenkemper – mastering
Robert Musso – recording
Petulia Mattioli;– artwork and graphic design
Masanari Tamai – photography

Release history

References

External links 
 

1999 albums
Collaborative albums
Eraldo Bernocchi albums
Toshinori Kondo albums
Bill Laswell albums